Tuja is a river of northern Poland. It flows through Nowy Dwór Gdański, and joins the Szkarpawa near Tujsk.

1Tuja
Rivers of Poland
Rivers of Pomeranian Voivodeship